The 11754 / 11753 Rewa - Itwari - Rewa Express is an Express train of the Indian Railways connecting Rewa Terminal in Madhya Pradesh and  of Maharashtra. It is currently being operated on a tri-weekly basis.

Route and halts 
The important halts of the train are:

Coach composition 
The train has refurbished ICF rake. The train consists of 20 coaches:
 1 AC I Tier
 1 AC II Tier
 3 AC III Tier
 13 Sleeper coaches
 4 General coaches

References 

West Central Railway zone
Indian railways articles needing expert attention
Rail transport in Maharashtra
Rail transport in Madhya Pradesh